Lithuania Ascending: A Pagan Empire within East-Central Europe, 1295–1345 is a Stephen Christopher Rowell's book published in 1994 by Cambridge University Press about the history of Lithuania of 1295–1345, centering on the expansion of pagan Lithuania in Eastern and Central Europe. It was republished in 1995, 1997, 2000.  translated the book into the Lithuanian language and it was published in 2001 by Baltos lankos.

References 

Cambridge University Press books
History books about Lithuania
Lithuanian books
1994 non-fiction books
1995 non-fiction books
1997 non-fiction books
2000 non-fiction books
2001 non-fiction books